Rachel Maclean (born 1987) is a Scottish multi-media artist. She lives and works in Glasgow. She has shown widely in the UK and internationally, in galleries, museums, film festivals and on television. Maclean produces elaborate films and digital prints using extravagant costume, over-the-top make-up, green screen vfx and electronic soundtracks.

Early life and education
Maclean was born in Edinburgh.

She has a BA in Drawing and Painting from Edinburgh College of Art.

Work
Maclean produces elaborate films and digital prints using extravagant costume, over-the-top make-up, green screen vfx and electronic soundtracks. Using film and photography, she creates outlandish characters and fantasy worlds which she uses to delve into politics, society and identity. Wearing colourful costumes and make-up, until recently Maclean took on every role in her films herself. She uses computer technology to generate her locations, and borrows audio from television and cinema to construct narratives with a comedic touch.

Maclean's artwork is both seductive and disturbing, it sucks the viewer into oversaturated candy coloured worlds and repels them with unsettling themes and narratives. She explores issues of identity, class, nationalism and gender, whilst referencing narrative structures from pop culture and fairy-tales.

Exhibitions
Maclean has had solo exhibitions at National Gallery of Australia, Canberra (2018), Tate Britain, London (2017), HOME, Manchester (2016), the Zabludowicz Collection, London (2014), Edinburgh Printmakers (2013), Collective Gallery, Edinburgh (2013), Trade Gallery, Nottingham (2013) and Generator Projects, Dundee (2012).

Her work has also been shown at the State Museum of Urban Sculpture, St Petersburg, Russia, Kunstarkaden, Munich, Germany, Kunsthalle, Kiel, Germany, Talbot Rice Gallery, Edinburgh, the Royal Scottish Academy, Edinburgh.

Maclean exhibited in  British Art Show 8 with Feed Me.

Maclean was selected to represent Scotland in Venice at the 57th International Art Exhibition of the Venice Biennale, 2017. This solo presentation of new work centred on a major new film commission. The presentation is commissioned and curated by Alchemy Film & Arts in partnership with Talbot Rice Gallery and the University of Edinburgh.

Awards
In 2013, Maclean received the Margaret Tait Award for her contribution to Glasgow Film Festival and was shortlisted for the Film London Jarman Award.

References

External links 

1987 births
Scottish artists
Living people